Elaine Stritch at Liberty is an autobiographical one-woman show written by Elaine Stritch and John Lahr, and produced by George C. Wolf, which is composed of anecdotes from Stritch's life, as well as showtunes and Broadway standards that mirror Stritch’s rise and fall both on and off the stage.

Synopsis
The show consists of spoken monologues from Stritch following her life and career, interspersed with showtunes and pop standards which complement her stories. Many of these songs had been previously sung by Stritch in major productions, such as "The Ladies Who Lunch" from Company and "Civilization" from Angel in the Wings which she originated on Broadway. Her experiences and relationship with show business are focal points, but she also explores more intimate, personal themes like her alcoholism and romantic relationships.

Productions
Originally directed and produced by George C. Wolfe at The Public Theater, the show premiered on November 7, 2001. After quickly selling out, the original engagement was extended twice: once until December 30 and then until January 6, 2002. The show then transferred to Broadway, opening on February 21, 2002 in the Neil Simon Theatre, closing on May 26 of that year.

Stritch continued to perform the show at regional and international venues.

Reception
The Broadway production was recognized with the 2002 Tony Award for Best Special Theatrical Event and the 2002 Drama Desk Award for Outstanding Book of a Musical.

Adaptation
The documentary adaptation directed by D. A. Pennebaker and Andy Picheta aired in 2004 on HBO.
It went on to win two Primetime Emmy Awards for Outstanding Variety, Music, or Comedy Special, and Individual Performance in a Variety or Music Program.

Song list
Songs are listed alphabetically, as presented in the Broadway program, with the note "the following songs may or may not be performed."

"All in Fun" (from Very Warm for May) — Jerome Kern and Oscar Hammerstein II
"Broadway Baby"§ (from Follies) — Stephen Sondheim
"But Not For Me" — George Gershwin and Ira Gershwin
"If Love Were All" (from Bitter Sweet) — Noël Coward
"Can You Use Any Money Today?"§ (from Call Me Madam) — Irving Berlin
"Civilization"§ (from Angel in the Wings) — Carl Sigman and Bob Hilliard
"Hooray for Hollywood" (from Hollywood Hotel) — Richard A. Whiting and Johnny Mercer
"I'm Still Here" (from Follies) — Stephen Sondheim
"I've Been to a Marvelous Party" — Noël Coward
"I Want a Long Time Daddy" — Porter Grainger
"The Little Things You Do Together"§ (from Company) — Stephen Sondheim
"Something Good" (from The Sound of Music) — Richard Rodgers
"The Ladies Who Lunch"§ (from Company) — Stephen Sondheim
"The Party's Over" (from Bells Are Ringing — Styne, Comden, and Green
"There Never Was a Baby Like My Baby" (from Two on the Aisle) — Styne, Comden, and Green
"There's No Business Like Show Business" (from Annie Get Your Gun) — Irving Berlin
"This Is All Very New to Me" (from Plain and Fancy) — Albert Hague and Arnold Horwitt
"Why Do The Wrong People Travel?"§ (from Sail Away) — Noël Coward
"Zip"§ (from Pal Joey) — Rodgers and Hart

Notes §: numbers previously performed by Stritch in professional productions

Recording
A recording of the original off-Broadway production was released on  April 9, 2002 by DRG Records, containing both the musical numbers and selected spoken material from the show.

References

External links
 Elaine Stritch & George Wolfe on creating At Liberty 14 December 2001 episode of PBS Theater Talk
 
 
 

Plays for one performer
Tony Award-winning plays
American plays adapted into films
Films directed by D. A. Pennebaker